The  is a  long river that flows through Saitama and Tokyo, Japan. It flows from the Musashino Plateau into the Sumida River at Iwabuchi in Kita, Tokyo.

References

External links

Rivers of Saitama Prefecture
Rivers of Tokyo
Rivers of Japan